Calfaria (the Welsh name for Calvary) may refer to:

Calfaria Baptist Chapel, Llanelli
Calfaria Chapel, Abercynon
Calfaria Chapel, Aberdare
Calfaria Chapel, Penygroes

See also
Bryn Calfaria, a hymn tune
Calvaria (disambiguation)
Calvary Church (disambiguation)